The 1991 Katsina State gubernatorial election occurred on 14 December 1991. NRC candidate Saidu Barda won the election, defeating SDP Umaru Musa Yar'Adua.

Conduct
The gubernatorial election was conducted using an open ballot system. Primaries for the two parties to select their flag bearers were conducted on October 19, 1991.

The election occurred on December 14, 1991. NRC candidate Saidu Barda won the election, defeating SDP Umaru Musa Yar'Adua.

References 

Gubernatorial election 1991
December 1991 events in Nigeria
Kat